Koineks Teknoloji A.Ş, known online as Thodex, is a defunct Turkey based cryptocurrency exchange founded by Faruk Fatih Özer.

Thodex was the first global exchange based in Turkey and of the 40 cryptocurrency exchanges in Turkey at the time, it was one of the big ones. It had 391,000 users when it froze in April 2021 and the owner fled Turkey with the clients' money.

Thodex was founded as Koineks in 2017, at the time only the 4th cryptocurrency exchange to be founded in Turkey. They established Turkeys first Bitcoin ATMs.
Koineks went global in 2020 changing its name to Thodex March 2020. That year, Thodex was also licensed by Financial Crimes Enforcement Network as a Money Service Business (MSB). The total transaction volume on Thodex was ~$3 as of November 2020. The exchange had various rewards campaigns to draw in new users and new capital.

Shutdown

What would turn out to be the last of these rewards campaigns ran from 15 March to 15 April 2021. It was a Dogecoin rewards campaign where they stated that they will distribute 2 million dogecoin, 150 per new user that signs up. This campaign was set up in the month leading up to what is known by fans of Dogecoin as Dogeday (April 20) a day at which Dogecoin fans expected Dogecoin to go up in price significantly. Due to the hype, over half of the trading on the exchange was in Dogecoin. On the 19th of April, users experienced some disruptions in their transactions. Following complaints, Thodex stated that the issues were due to the exchange being under a cyberattack and the next day, April 20, trading on Thodex was halted entirely.

Thodex ensured users in a statement that things would resume to normal in 4–5 days and that trading had temporarily shut down because "big-name banks" were interested in investing substantially as partners of the exchange, and they needed to temporarily suspend trading for the partnership to settle. In the meantime, Faruk Fatih Özer, the owner of the exchange, left Turkey for Tirana Albania with $2B of cryptocurrency in their possession.

Complaints by users led to the start of an investigation on April 22 by public prosecutors, and after determining that users of Thodex could not access their funds and verifying that Özer had indeed left Turkey financial crimes agents froze all the assets of Thodex. Arrest warrants were issued for Özer and 81 other suspects. The Cyber Crimes Directorate arrested all suspects except for Özer himself, the arrested suspects included Özers two brothers. An Interpol Red Notice was issued for Özer the next day. The Istanbul Public Prosecutors Office opened an fraud investigation into the owner, and an investigation into Thodex in the scope of tax offenses and Consumer Protection Law. The prosecutors also requested that the Cyber Crimes Directorate establish contact with foreign exchanges to determine if Özer had sent Bitcoins to their Binance address and if so whether those could be frozen/confiscated.

In May, the first hearing for a victim of the frozen exchange was held by the Anatolian Civil Court. They sued Thodex for the taking/using of deposited money contrary to the user agreement.

The Public Prosecutors' office in 2022 reportedly received certain receipts that showed that Özer had compensated some of the victims out of remorse. Nevertheless, 21 of the suspects including Özer were indicted for 3 separate crimes and face up to 40,564 year collective prison sentence.

The court determined that the suspects had converted their clients' money to cryptocurrency and gold, and that they had lured in their victims with deceptive advertising.

The arrest of Faruk Özer was made public by the Ministry of Interior of Turkey on 30 August 2022. Albanian authorities had apprehended him in Vlorë.

Aftermath

After the Thodex collapse, Turkey which did not have any regulations regarding cryptocurrency exchange operations started to look into ways to regulate cryptocurrency and new regulations followed in 2021.

References

Notes

Citations

Bibliography

2017 establishments
Cryptocurrencies
Digital currency exchanges